St. Matthews School, also known as St. Matthew School, is a historic Rosenwald School building located near Raleigh, Wake County, North Carolina. It was built in 1922, and is a one-story, frame building with a hipped roof and sheathed in weatherboard. It sits on a concrete block foundation. The school closed in 1949. St. Matthews Baptist Church owns the school and uses the building as a meeting hall.

It was listed on the National Register of Historic Places in 2001.

References

Rosenwald schools in North Carolina
School buildings on the National Register of Historic Places in North Carolina
School buildings completed in 1922
Schools in Wake County, North Carolina
National Register of Historic Places in Wake County, North Carolina
1922 establishments in North Carolina